Mohammadi-ye Olya (also Romanized as Moḩammadī-ye ‘Olyā; also known as Moshayyeh) is a village in Heydariyeh Rural District, Govar District, Gilan-e Gharb County, Kermanshah Province, Iran. At the 2006 census, its population was 187, in 41 families.

References 

Populated places in Gilan-e Gharb County